Recep Yemişçi (born 1 January 1999) is a Turkish professional footballer who plays as a centre-back for the Turkish club Ankaraspor.

Professional career
Yemişçi is a youth product of the academies of Bucaspor and Altınordu, and began his senior career with Altınordu in 2016. He moved to Niğde Anadolu on loan for 2 season from 2019 to 2021. In July 2021, he joined Ankaraspor on loan for a season. On 6 August 2022, he transferred to the Süper Lig club Kasımpaşa. He made his professional debut 2 days later with Kasımpaşa in a 4–0 Süper Lig loss to İstanbul Başakşehir.

International career
Yemişçi is a youth international for Turkey, having represented them from U16s to U19s.

References

External links
 

1999 births
Footballers from İzmir
Living people
Turkish footballers
Turkey youth international footballers
Association football defenders
Altınordu F.K. players
Niğde Anadolu FK footballers
Ankaraspor footballers
Kasımpaşa S.K. footballers
Süper Lig players
TFF First League players
TFF Second League players